Diego Santiago Fagúndez Pepe (born February 14, 1995) is a Uruguayan professional footballer who plays as an attacking midfielder for Major League Soccer club Austin FC.

Early life
Born in Montevideo, Uruguay, Fagúndez moved with his family to Leominster, Massachusetts when he was five years old. Fagúndez began his  career playing for Leominster Youth Soccer.

He then went on to play for FC United (Massachusetts) and FC Greater Boston Bolts, before joining the New England Revolution academy team in 2009. He was a State Cup finalist with FC United 2005 and winner in 2006. He won the State Cup with FC Greater Boston Bolts in 2008 and 2009. He also played for the Massachusetts Olympic Development Program (ODP) from 2006 to 2009, as captain from 2008 to 2009. He was named a 2007–2008 Adidas Interregional All-Star as a member of the Region I ODP team. In his debut season he led the Revs' U-16 squad to a 14–7–8 record (50 pts), placing first in the Northeast Division of the US Soccer Development Academy. He scored 20 goals in 30 appearances, tying Felix Debona for the team lead in goals.

On March 10, 2011, Top Drawer Soccer named Fagúndez their number one ranked player nationally in the class of 2013.

Club career

New England Revolution 

On November 15, 2010, Fagúndez was signed to a contract by the New England Revolution, making him the first ever homegrown player the Revolution signed from its youth academy. Although on the main club roster, he continued to train with and play for the academy team.

He made his full professional debut on April 26, 2011, in a Revs' 3–2 victory over D.C. United in the Lamar Hunt US Open Cup. He made his league debut on August 6, 2011, as a substitute against Chivas USA, where he drew a penalty (which was converted by Shalrie Joseph) and scored his first goal for New England.

Fagúndez became a regular starter for the New England Revolution in 2013, when he had a successful breakout season, scoring 13 goals and assisting 7. Fagúndez quickly became one of MLS's great young talents, and won player of the week honors in week 14 of the 2013 MLS season. Fagúndez obtained a US green card in October 2013 qualifying him as a domestic player under MLS squad rules. He was featured on an episode of documentary television show that MLS 36 in August 2013.

Prior to the start of the 2015 season, rumors emerged of interest in Fagúndez from Serie A sides Atalanta B.C. and ACF Fiorentina, Neither side, however, was willing to match the $4 million fee asked by the Revolution for Fagúndez's services.

During the 2015 season, Fagúndez became the youngest player in MLS history to reach 100 appearances for his club.

Fagúndez was named the Midnight Riders Man of Year at the conclusion of the 2017 MLS season.

On October 28, 2018, prior to the Revolution's final match of the 2018 season, Fagúndez's father (who also serves as his agent) posted a tweet insinuating that it could be his son's final appearance for the franchise. The match, against the Montreal Impact, saw Fagúndez's 50th career MLS goal. He is currently the youngest player in MLS history to score 50 goals.

On January 22, 2019, multiple sources reported that the Revolution turned down an offer from Club Nacional de Football for Fagúndez.

The Revolution exercised Fagúndez's 2020 contract option prior to the start of the 2020 season.

Fagúndez made his 244th appearance for the Revolution in the franchises' 2020 season opener against the Chicago Fire, tying Jay Heaps for fourth most appearances all time.

Going into the final match of the 2020 regular season against the Philadelphia Union, Fagúndez was one appearance shy of breaking the Revolution's all-time appearance record, held by Shalrie Joseph. Fagúndez did not appear in the match, thus ending the season one appearance shy of breaking the record. The Revolution lost the match 2-0.

On November 20, 2020, as Fagúndez was nearing the end of his contract with the Revolution, news emerged that Fagúndez had received an offer for a contract extension from the Revolution as well as interest from other MLS clubs, and clubs in La Liga and Liga MX. In 2016 Fagúndez had signed a three-year contract plus a club option for a fourth year.

On December 8, 2020, the Revolution announced their end of season roster moves. Fagúndez was listed as out of contract with the franchise. On his personal Instagram account, he posted a farewell statement to the Revolution and their fans stating that it was time for him to move on. In an interview with The Boston Globes Frank Dell'Apa, Fagúndez stated that he wanted to remain with the team, but felt a low-ball offer was presented, and he declined to accept it.

Austin FC 

On January 5, 2021, Fagúndez signed a one-year deal with Austin FC. On April 24, 2021, Fagúndez made his first starting appearance for his new team, and scored the first goal in the franchise's history in its 3-1 win over the Colorado Rapids. He would score again the following week, this time notching the game winner in the franchise's 1-0 win over Minnesota United. He was the Man of the Match for Austin's first-ever home match in a 0-0 draw against the San Jose Earthquakes and quickly became a fan favorite.

Fagundez scored his first goal of the 2022 season, an equalizer in a 1-1 draw against the Seattle Sounders as a substitute. He also had Austin's first ever goal in national competition play in a 2-1 loss to San Antonio FC of the 2022 U.S. Open Cup on April 20. Three days later, Fagundez had two second half assists to come back from 2-0 and win 3-2 at D.C. United including the game-winning goal.

International career
Fagúndez is a former Uruguay youth international. He made his debut for Uruguay U20 team in October 2012. He played two games for Uruguay U20 against Peru in that month.  In the first he entered as a substitute in the 83rd minute; in the second fixture he was brought on in the 45th minute.

In April 2013, he stated that he would be willing to represent either Uruguay or the United States at the 2013 FIFA U-20 World Cup. However, he was not called up by Uruguay and was not eligible for represent U.S. at the time due to not having citizenship.

In August 2014, he was called up again for the Uruguay U20 national team and played in two games against Peru, a 1–0 win victory and a 1–1 draw.

In January 2015, Fagúndez was called up for the 2015 South American Youth Championship. He played in Uruguay's 1–0 victory over Colombia.

Personal life
Diego's father, Washington Fagúndez, was a professional footballer in Uruguay who played as a goalkeeper with Central Español in the 1990s. 
Diego is the godson of former Uruguayan international footballer and 1995 Copa América winner Diego Dorta, after whom he is named.

Fagúndez received his U.S. green card in October 2013, which qualifies him as a domestic player for MLS roster purposes.

Career statistics

References

External links 

Revolution player profile
Soccer phenom opts to learn from the pros at Boston Globe

US Soccer Development Academy

1995 births
Living people
Footballers from Montevideo
Uruguayan people of Spanish descent
New England Revolution players
Uruguayan footballers
Uruguay youth international footballers
Uruguayan expatriate footballers
Expatriate soccer players in the United States
Major League Soccer players
2015 South American Youth Football Championship players
Association football forwards
Association football midfielders
Homegrown Players (MLS)
Austin FC players
Soccer players from Massachusetts